David Samuel Lifton (September 20, 1939 – December 6, 2022) was an American author who wrote the 1981 bestseller Best Evidence: Disguise and Deception in the Assassination of John F. Kennedy, a work that puts forth evidence that there was a conspiracy to assassinate John F. Kennedy.

Biography
Lifton grew up in Rockaway Beach, New York. He graduated from Cornell University's School of Engineering Physics in 1962 and thereupon enrolled in the University of California, Los Angeles to work on an advance degree in engineering. While there Lifton worked nights as a computer engineer for North American Aviation, a contractor for the Apollo program. In autumn 1964, around the time the Warren Report was published, Lifton became interested in the JFK case after attending a lecture on the topic of the conspiracy to cover up the Kennedy assassination by Mark Lane. Lifton purchased a set of the 26 volumes of the Warren Commission's investigation and started his own research on the Kennedy case. In 1966, Lifton was dismissed from UCLA for neglecting his studies.  He quit his aerospace job, devoting all his time to the Kennedy assassination.

The January 1967 issue of Ramparts magazine presented a "special report" by Lifton, with David Welsh, entitled "The Case for Three Assassins" that laid out the scenario that more than one assassin was firing at Kennedy based on anomalies in the medical evidence.

In 1993, Lifton was played by Robert Picardo in the television movie Fatal Deception: Mrs. Lee Harvey Oswald. He testified before the Assassination Records Review Board in September 1996, and provided the Board with various materials including 35mm interpositives of the Zapruder film, as well as copies of audiotapes, videotapes, and transcripts of witness interviews he conducted.

As of 2010, Lifton lived in West Los Angeles where he was working full-time on a major written work about Oswald entitled Final Charade.

Lifton died on December 6, 2022, at the age of 83.

Best Evidence
After Lifton's book Best Evidence: Disguise and Deception in the Assassination of John F. Kennedy was rejected by 21 or 23 other publishers, Macmillan gave Lifton a $10,000 advance and published his book in 1981. Due to the controversial nature of the book, Macmillan went to unusual lengths to fact-check the book; it was "examined for potential factual errors by in-house counsel, an outside law firm, a forensic pathologist, and a neurosurgeon." The book eventually reached #4 on The New York Times Best Seller list and was a Book of the Month Club selection.

In 1990, Edwin McDowell of The New York Times described Best Evidence as "one of the most durable" of the dozens of books about the Kennedy assassination. According to Kent Carroll of Carroll & Graf Publishers, who reprinted a soft-cover version in 1988, the book sold 60,000 copies in 1990 alone. In the updated 1988 edition of Best Evidence, Lifton was responsible for the first publication of a series of autopsy photographs taken of President Kennedy at Bethesda Naval Medical Center. Lifton had acquired these photos after the initial publication of Best Evidence, from a former Secret Service employee who had made private copies with the permission of Agent Roy Kellerman. Lifton also used the photos during his appearance on the October 1988 PBS Nova episode Who Shot President Kennedy?, which marked the first time they were shown on television. Lifton claimed that the actual photographs are consistent with his thesis of body alteration.

Summary
Best Evidence is written in the first-person as a chronological narrative of his 15-year search for the truth about the Kennedy assassination.  It is not written just as a theory of what took place on November 22, 1963, but also to highlight his personal quest to solve the puzzle through a meticulous and time-consuming search for new evidence that could finally resolve the many factual conflicts in the record.

The central thesis of the book is that President Kennedy’s body had been altered between the Dallas hospital and the autopsy site at Bethesda for the purpose of creating erroneous conclusions about the number and direction of the shots. He details evidence—using both the Warren Commission documents and original research and interviews with those involved at both Dallas and Bethesda—of a stark and radical change between the descriptions of the wounds by the medical staff at Dallas and those at Bethesda. For instance, nearly all the Dallas medical staff thought the head wound entered from the front and exited through a 2-in. by 2.-in. hole in the exterior. The autopsy, on the contrary, reported a massive exit wound in the front (about 4x the size of the reports of the Dallas staff), which would indicate a shot from the rear.

It was these sort of conflicts that drove his quest. The Warren Commission had ultimately resolved them through relying on what was considered the “best evidence”, the autopsy report and photos; but that didn’t satisfy Lifton.

As Lifton was methodically working through the 26-volume Warren Commission report and exhibits, he stumbled upon what would become the fulcrum of his narrative, the answer he was looking for. He read, according to a report by FBI agents Siebert and O'Neill who attended the autopsy and took notes on everything they observed, that it was "apparent that a tracheotomy had been performed...as well as surgery of the head area, namely, in the top of the skull." Since Lifton knew that there was no surgery to the head in Dallas, this was the fact that intensified and focused his research, leading ultimately to the synthesis of the contradictory Dallas/Bethesda evidence to his conclusion that there was intentional fraud, that is, as Lifton puts it, a “medical forgery” to the body of the President.

In connection with his body alteration theory, Lifton hypothesized about when and where the alteration took place.  He posits that after John F. Kennedy's assassination, unnamed conspirators on Air Force One removed Kennedy's body from its original bronze casket and placed it in a shipping casket, while en route from Dallas to Washington. Once the presidential plane arrived at Andrews Air Force Base, the shipping casket with the President's body in it was surreptitiously taken by helicopter from the side of the plane that was out of the television camera's view. Kennedy's body was then taken to an unknown location — most likely Walter Reed Army Medical Center — where the body was surgically altered to make it appear that he was shot only from the rear.

Among the explicitly stated clear implications of the book are the following:  The assassination was an “inside” job with, at minimum, a number of secret service men involved—the ones who controlled the scene and the evidence and Oswald was, as he stated after his arrest, “a patsy."

Reception
Ed Magnuson of Time described the theory as "bizarre", but wrote that Lifton's work was "meticulously researched". According to Magnuson: "Preposterous? Absolutely. Yet there is virtually no factual claim in Lifton's book that is not supported by the public record or his own interviews, many of them with the lowly hospital and military bystanders whom official probes had overlooked."

Thomas Powers gave a critical review of the book in New York magazine stating: "There are a lot of curious theories about what happened to John F. Kennedy on November 22, 1963, but none quite so bizarre as David Lifton's, a theory that makes all previous speculation about the president's murder... look like the work of dull and sober men." Powers' review was particularly harsh on Lifton's publisher, adding "Lifton is not to blame for this travesty" and asserting that Macmillan owed an apology to everyone involved in the transport of Kennedy's body from Dallas to Washington. Reviewing the book for The New York Times, Harrison Salisbury wrote: "...no one before Mr. Lifton has constructed a theory so complicated, so quirky, in such violation of every law of common sense and reason."

Discussing some of the books espousing a conspiracy in the assassination of Kennedy, Stephen E. Ambrose wrote in 1992: "Mr. Lifton argues that the conspirators who killed Kennedy got possession of Kennedy's body somewhere between Dallas and Washington, then removed his brain and otherwise altered his body and wounds to support a single-gunman theory. Mr. Lifton's account of how this was done is almost impossible to follow, almost impossible to believe and almost impossible to refute."

Author and lawyer Gerald Posner has described Lifton's book as "one of the most unusual conspiracy theories" that "relies on an elaborate shell game involving rapid exchanges of coffins, a decoy ambulance, and a switched body shroud. He contends that once the body (of President Kennedy) was stolen from Air Force One, a covert team of surgeons surgically altered the corpse before the autopsy later that day...purportedly...so the autopsy physicians would determine the bullets that hit the President were fired from the rear...thereby sealing the case against Oswald." Vincent Bugliosi devoted twelve pages to Lifton's theory in his 2007 book, Reclaiming History: The Assassination of President John F. Kennedy. Bugliosi prefaced his comments stating that the "theory is so unhinged that it really doesn't deserve one word in any serious treatment of the assassination", but that he was "forced to devote some time to talking about nonsense of a most exquisite nature" due to the number of people who treated it seriously.

There were many negative reviews from the major-media outlets, noting poor documentation and spurious claims. According to a Los Angeles Times article about Mr. Lifton: "The Orlando Sentinel Star went so far as to compare the book in stature and import to William L. Shirer's The Rise and Fall of the Third Reich. Other reviewers characterized Lifton's work as 'meticulously detailed,' 'methodical and well-documented' and 'a challenge to the Warren Commission.'"

References 

1939 births
2022 deaths
American conspiracy theorists
Cornell University College of Engineering alumni
John F. Kennedy conspiracy theorists
People from Rockaway, Queens
Researchers of the assassination of John F. Kennedy